Henry Ogg Forbes LLD (30 January 1851 – 27 October 1932) was a Scottish explorer, ornithologist, and botanist. He also described a new species of spider, Thomisus decipiens.

Biography
Forbes was the son of Rev Alexander Forbes M.A. (1821–1897), and his wife Mary née Ogg (1820–1862), and was born at Drumblade, Huntly, Aberdeenshire.

Henry was educated at Aberdeen Grammar School, he then studied Medicine at the University of Aberdeen and the University of Edinburgh, An eye injury forced him to abandon his studies and he did not graduate. From 1875 he began collecting scientific samples: firstly in Portugal and from 1878 to 1884 he made extensive collections in Indonesia.

Forbes was active primarily in the Moluccas, Sumatra and New Guinea. His unusual tasks there also included tracking down the murderers of Captain J. C. Craig on Joannet Island in his temporary capacity as a government agent. In 1887 he was appointed meteorological observer at Port Moresby in New Guinea and used this opportunity to attempt further exploration of the island interior. The map he made from these explorations was deemed "unreliable" and he was not paid for his efforts. Disgruntled he decided to return to Britain. However he made a major stay in New Zealand before achieving this.

He served as Director of the Canterbury Museum in New Zealand between 1890 and 1893, and eventually moved to Liverpool, England, where he served as a consulting Director of Museums there until his death.

Forbes coordinated and led the Liverpool and British Museums joint expedition to Socotra and Abd al Kuri in 1898–1899.

Henry Ogg Forbes dedicated his book A Naturalist's Wanderings in the Eastern Archipelago to the zoologist William Alexander Forbes, who died on an expedition to West Africa in 1883. They had been friends and classmate at the University of Edinburgh. Forbes is mentioned in A Short History of Nearly Everything by Bill Bryson.

He died in Selsey in Sussex on 27 October 1932.

Family

His older brother George Stuart Forbes (1849–1940) came to fame in the Indian Civil Service and was knighted for these services.

Henry married Annabella Keith in Batavia in 1882. Keith travelled extensively with her husband, assisting him with his collections and writing several books relating to their travels as well as contributing to scientific research, particularly on bird species.

Legacy
Henry Ogg Forbes is commemorated in the scientific names of three species of reptiles: Hemidactylus forbesii, Oligodon forbesi, and Sphenomorphus forbesi.

Gallery

References

External links

 
 
Henry Ogg Forbes at Bright Sparcs

1851 births
1932 deaths
People from Huntly
Scottish explorers
Scottish botanists
Scottish ornithologists
Alumni of the University of Aberdeen
Alumni of the University of Edinburgh
Directors of Canterbury Museum, Christchurch
20th-century British scientists
19th-century New Zealand scientists
19th-century British scientists
People from Selsey